Thomas A. Kenneth Laidlaw (born 16 March 1936) is a retired Scottish professional cyclist. With Robert Millar and David Millar, he is one of only three Scots to finish the Tour de France. He is also one of the first British riders to finish the Tour.

Early career
Laidlaw raced as an amateur in Scotland in the 1950s. He won the Tour of Scotland in 1957 and reportedly won several British titles and held several records.

Laidlaw qualified for the 1960 Summer Olympics in Rome, and raced in two events. He finished in 53rd place in the men's road race. He also competed in the 100 km Men's Team Time Trial, finishing 14th.

Professional career
Laidlaw raced the European pro circuit during his professional career between 1961 and 1962. In 1961 he rode for Margnat – Rochet – Dunlop, and in 1962 for Margnat – Paloma.

Laidlaw's most famous moment came in the 1961 Tour de France, when he led Stage 16 until about 7 km to go. The stage took in a climb from Luchon to the summit of the Superbagnères, an ascent of 4000 ft in 11 miles. For his effort he was awarded £145 for the most aggressive rider of the day award. The stage was won by Imerio Massignan who won the mountains classification in that year. Laidlaw finished the Tour in 65th place.

the pack begins the climb out of Luchon, Radio Tour announced; "attack by number 90….LaidLaw! He went past the pack, moving at a good rate with the French tri colour jerseys, and Anquetil in the race leader’s yellow jersey at the front……and out 100 yards ahead of them was the unmistakeable figure of Ken Laidlaw thrashing away for all he was worth"
sporting cyclist

Post-cycling
Following disillusionment with professional cycling, Laidlaw moved to New York in 1964 to continue working as a carpenter and later spent many years living in Savannah, Georgia after his cycling career.

The Ken Laidlaw Sportive is a Cyclosportive named after the rider, held in his native Hawick in the Scottish Borders.

References

External links 
Interview with Savannah local newspaper
Hamish Smith Jeweller, manufacturer of medal for Ken Laidlaw Sportive
Falkirk Bicycle Club description of Ken Laidlaw sportif and 1961 Tour

1939 births
Living people
Sportspeople from Hawick
Scottish male cyclists
Olympic cyclists of Great Britain
Cyclists at the 1960 Summer Olympics